Kiss My Soul is a 1996 album by Roger Chapman, the former lead singer of the 1970s British progressive band Family.

Track listing

Personnel 

 Roger Chapman — Harmonica, Vocals
 Joe Chemay — Bass guitar
 Geoff Dugmore — Drums
 Steve Simpson — Guitar
 Jay Stapley — Guitar
 Carol Thompson — Background vocals
 Juliet Roberts — Background vocals

References 

Roger Chapman albums
1996 albums